Cyrtotrachelus elegans is a beetle species belonging to the genus Cyrtotrachelus. It is found in the Philippines.

References

External links 
 Cyrtotrachelus elegans at Biolib
 
 Cyrtotrachelus elegans at insectoid.info

Dryophthorinae
Beetles described in 1878
Arthropods of the Philippines